Slaoui or Slawi is a surname. It may refer to:

Abu Bakr Ibn Abi Zaid as-Slawi, pasha, or qaid, of Casablanca, Morocco 
Houcine Slaoui (1921–1951), Moroccan singer and composer
Moncef Slaoui (born 1959), Moroccan-born American-Belgian vaccine researcher
Nawal Slaoui (born 1966), Moroccan alpine skier

See also
Abderrahman Slaoui Museum, a museum in Casablanca, Morocco